Darío Alejandro Gandín (born 7 December 1983) is an Argentine football striker who plays for Atlético de Rafaela.

Career

Gandín started his career in the Primera B Nacional (Argentine second division) playing for Atlético de Rafaela in 2001. He helped the team win both the Apertura and Clausura titles during the 2002–03 season, resulting in automatic promotion to the Argentine Primera División.

In 2004, Gandín left Atlético de Rafaela to join Club Atlético Colón, a club he later rejoined in 2007, after spells with Argentinos Juniors, Gimnasia y Esgrima de Jujuy and León of Mexico.

The forward arrived to Independiente in 2008. In the 2009 Apertura, Gandín scored 10 goals in 19 matches, and was subsequently sold to Necaxa in Mexico.

In 2011, Gandín returned to Atlético de Rafaela, recently promoted to the Primera División. On August 5, 2011, he scored the first two goals of the 2011–12 Argentine Primera División season in Rafaela's 2–0 away victory over Banfield.

On 9 July 2013, Gandín rejoined Colón for a third time.

In 2016, he joined Ben Hur of Rafaela.

Honours
Atlético de Rafaela
 Primera B Nacional (1): 2002–03

References

External links
 Darío Gandín – Argentine Primera statistics at Fútbol XXI 
  Gandín signed with Atlético de Rafaela
 

1983 births
Living people
Footballers from Santa Fe, Argentina
Argentine footballers
Association football forwards
Atlético de Rafaela footballers
Aldosivi footballers
Club Atlético Colón footballers
Argentinos Juniors footballers
Gimnasia y Esgrima de Jujuy footballers
Club Atlético Independiente footballers
Club León footballers
Club Necaxa footballers
Argentine Primera División players
Liga MX players
Argentine expatriate footballers
Expatriate footballers in Mexico